The men's 10 metre platform diving competition at the 2006 Asian Games in Doha was held on 14 December at the Hamad Aquatic Centre.

Schedule
All times are Arabia Standard Time (UTC+03:00)

Results

Preliminary

Final

References 

Results

Diving at the 2006 Asian Games